PFRA may refer to:

 Prairie Farm Rehabilitation Administration
 Professional Football Researchers Association
 Public Fundraising Regulatory Association, see Consumer protection in the United Kingdom
 pFra, a phospholipase involved in transmission of Yersinia pestis